The Oliphant–Walker House is a historic home in the Hyde Park Historic District in Austin, Texas. It is also a part of the Shadow Lawn Historic District, a subdivision within the Hyde Park neighborhood established by Hyde Park founder Monroe M. Shipe.

History
The house was built in 1894 by area resident William J. Oliphant (1845–1930), an accomplished photographer.

It is a prime example of Queen Anne style architecture, with an elaborate balustrade, front gable, and friezes. The house was sold to Anna Walker, president of the Texas Woman Suffrage Association, in 1916.

The house is located at 3900 Avenue C. It was added to the National Register of Historic Places in 1990.

References

Houses on the National Register of Historic Places in Texas
Houses in Austin, Texas
National Register of Historic Places in Austin, Texas
City of Austin Historic Landmarks